{{DISPLAYTITLE:E6 (mathematics)}}

In mathematics, E6 is the name of some closely related Lie groups, linear algebraic groups or their Lie algebras , all of which have dimension 78; the same notation E6 is used for the corresponding root lattice, which has rank 6.  The designation E6 comes from the Cartan–Killing classification of the complex simple Lie algebras (see ). This classifies Lie algebras into four infinite series labeled An, Bn, Cn, Dn, and five exceptional cases labeled E6, E7, E8, F4, and G2. The E6 algebra is thus one of the five exceptional cases.

The fundamental group of the complex form, compact real form, or any algebraic version of E6 is the cyclic group Z/3Z, and its outer automorphism group is the cyclic group Z/2Z. Its fundamental representation is 27-dimensional (complex), and a basis is given by the 27 lines on a cubic surface. The dual representation, which is inequivalent, is also 27-dimensional.

In particle physics, E6 plays a role in some grand unified theories.

Real and complex forms 
There is a unique complex Lie algebra of type E6, corresponding to a complex group of complex dimension 78. The complex adjoint Lie group E6 of complex dimension 78 can be considered as a simple real Lie group of real dimension 156. This has fundamental group Z/3Z, has maximal compact subgroup the compact form (see below) of E6, and has an outer automorphism group non-cyclic of order 4 generated by complex conjugation and by the outer automorphism which already exists as a complex automorphism.

As well as the complex Lie group of type E6, there are five real forms of the Lie algebra, and correspondingly five real forms of the group with trivial center (all of which have an algebraic double cover, and three of which have further non-algebraic covers, giving further real forms), all of real dimension 78, as follows:

 The compact form (which is usually the one meant if no other information is given), which has fundamental group Z/3Z and outer automorphism group Z/2Z.
 The split form, EI (or E6(6)), which has maximal compact subgroup Sp(4)/(±1), fundamental group of order 2 and outer automorphism group of order 2.
 The quasi-split form EII (or E6(2)), which has maximal compact subgroup SU(2) × SU(6)/(center), fundamental group cyclic of order 6 and outer automorphism group of order 2.
 EIII (or E6(-14)), which has maximal compact subgroup SO(2) × Spin(10)/(center), fundamental group Z and trivial outer automorphism group.
  EIV (or E6(-26)), which has maximal compact subgroup F4, trivial fundamental group cyclic and outer automorphism group of order 2.

The EIV form of E6 is the group of collineations (line-preserving transformations) of the octonionic projective plane OP2. It is also the group of determinant-preserving linear transformations of the exceptional Jordan algebra. The exceptional Jordan algebra is 27-dimensional, which explains why the compact real form of E6 has a 27-dimensional complex representation. The compact real form of E6 is the isometry group of a 32-dimensional Riemannian manifold known as the 'bioctonionic projective plane'; similar constructions for E7 and E8 are known as the Rosenfeld projective planes, and are part of the Freudenthal magic square.

E6 as an algebraic group 
By means of a Chevalley basis for the Lie algebra, one can define E6 as a linear algebraic group over the integers and, consequently, over any commutative ring and in particular over any field: this defines the so-called split (sometimes also known as "untwisted") adjoint form of E6. Over an algebraically closed field, this and its triple cover are the only forms; however, over other fields, there are often many other forms, or "twists" of E6, which are classified in the general framework of Galois cohomology (over a perfect field k) by the set H1(k, Aut(E6)) which, because the Dynkin diagram of E6 (see below) has automorphism group Z/2Z, maps to H1(k, Z/2Z) = Hom (Gal(k), Z/2Z) with kernel H1(k, E6,ad).

Over the field of real numbers, the real component of the identity of these algebraically twisted forms of E6 coincide with the three real Lie groups mentioned above, but with a subtlety concerning the fundamental group: all adjoint forms of E6 have fundamental group Z/3Z in the sense of algebraic geometry, with Galois action as on the third roots of unity; this means that they admit exactly one triple cover (which may be trivial on the real points); the further non-compact real Lie group forms of E6 are therefore not algebraic and admit no faithful finite-dimensional representations.  The compact real form of E6 as well as the noncompact forms EI=E6(6) and EIV=E6(-26) are said to be inner or of type 1E6 meaning that their class lies in H1(k, E6,ad) or that complex conjugation induces the trivial automorphism on the Dynkin diagram, whereas the other two real forms are said to be outer or of type 2E6.

Over finite fields, the Lang–Steinberg theorem implies that H1(k, E6) = 0, meaning that E6 has exactly one twisted form, known as 2E6: see below.

Automorphisms of an Albert Algebra 
Similar to how the algebraic group G2 is the automorphism group of the octonions and the algebraic group F4 is the automorphism group of an Albert algebra, an exceptional Jordan algebra, the algebraic group E6 is the group of linear automorphisms of an Albert algebra that preserve a certain cubic form, called the "determinant".

Algebra

Dynkin diagram 

Roots of E6 

Although they span a six-dimensional space, it is much more symmetrical to consider them as vectors in a six-dimensional subspace of a nine-dimensional space. Then one can take the roots to be
(1,−1,0;0,0,0;0,0,0), (−1,1,0;0,0,0;0,0,0),
(−1,0,1;0,0,0;0,0,0), (1,0,−1;0,0,0;0,0,0),
(0,1,−1;0,0,0;0,0,0), (0,−1,1;0,0,0;0,0,0),
(0,0,0;1,−1,0;0,0,0), (0,0,0;−1,1,0;0,0,0),
(0,0,0;−1,0,1;0,0,0), (0,0,0;1,0,−1;0,0,0),
(0,0,0;0,1,−1;0,0,0), (0,0,0;0,−1,1;0,0,0),
(0,0,0;0,0,0;1,−1,0), (0,0,0;0,0,0;−1,1,0),
(0,0,0;0,0,0;−1,0,1), (0,0,0;0,0,0;1,0,−1),
(0,0,0;0,0,0;0,1,−1), (0,0,0;0,0,0;0,−1,1),
plus all 27 combinations of  where  is one of 
plus all 27 combinations of  where  is one of 

Simple roots

One possible selection for the simple roots of E6 is: 
(0,0,0;0,0,0;0,1,−1)

(0,0,0;0,0,0;1,−1,0)

(0,0,0;0,1,−1;0,0,0)

(0,0,0;1,−1,0;0,0,0)

(0,1,−1;0,0,0;0,0,0)

E6 roots derived from the roots of E8 
E6 is the subset of E8 where a consistent set of three coordinates are equal (e.g. first or last). This facilitates explicit definitions of E7 and E6 as:

E7 = {α ∈  Z7 ∪ (Z+)7 :  Σαi2 + α12 = 2, Σαi + α1 ∈ 2Z},
E6 = {α ∈  Z6 ∪ (Z+)6 :  Σαi2 + 2α12 = 2, Σαi + 2α1 ∈ 2Z}

The following 72 E6 roots are derived in this manner from the split real even E8 roots. Notice the last 3 dimensions being the same as required:

An alternative description 
An alternative (6-dimensional) description of the root system, which is useful in considering E6 × SU(3) as a subgroup of E8, is the following:

All  permutations of
 preserving the zero at the last entry,

and all of the following roots with an odd number of plus signs

Thus the 78 generators consist of the following subalgebras:

 A 45-dimensional SO(10) subalgebra, including the above  generators plus the five Cartan generators corresponding to the first five entries.
These have a non-zero last entry.
 1 generator which is their chirality generator, and is the sixth Cartan generator.

One choice of simple roots for E6 is given by the rows of the following matrix, indexed in the order :

Weyl group 
The Weyl group of E6 is of order 51840: it is the automorphism group of the unique simple group of order 25920 (which can be described as any of: PSU4(2), PSΩ6−(2), PSp4(3) or PSΩ5(3)).

Cartan matrix

Important subalgebras and representations 
The Lie algebra E6 has an F4 subalgebra, which is the fixed subalgebra of an outer automorphism, and an SU(3) × SU(3) × SU(3) subalgebra. Other maximal subalgebras which have an importance in physics (see below) and can be read off the Dynkin diagram, are the algebras of SO(10) × U(1) and SU(6) × SU(2).

In addition to the 78-dimensional adjoint representation, there  are two dual 27-dimensional "vector" representations.

The characters of finite dimensional representations of the real and complex Lie algebras and Lie groups are all given by the Weyl character formula.  The dimensions of the smallest irreducible representations are :

1, 27 (twice), 78, 351 (four times), 650, 1728 (twice), 2430, 2925, 3003 (twice), 5824 (twice), 7371 (twice), 7722 (twice), 17550 (twice), 19305 (four times), 34398 (twice), 34749, 43758, 46332 (twice), 51975 (twice), 54054 (twice), 61425 (twice), 70070, 78975 (twice), 85293, 100386 (twice), 105600, 112320 (twice), 146432 (twice), 252252 (twice), 314496 (twice), 359424 (four times), 371800 (twice), 386100 (twice), 393822 (twice), 412776 (twice), 442442 (twice)...

The underlined terms in the sequence above are the dimensions of those irreducible representations possessed by the adjoint form of E6 (equivalently, those whose weights belong to the root lattice of E6), whereas the full sequence gives the dimensions of the irreducible representations of the simply connected form of E6.

The symmetry of the Dynkin diagram of E6 explains why many dimensions occur twice, the corresponding representations being related by the non-trivial outer automorphism; however, there are sometimes even more representations than this, such as four of dimension 351, two of which are fundamental and two of which are not.

The fundamental representations have dimensions 27, 351, 2925, 351, 27 and 78 (corresponding to the six nodes in the Dynkin diagram in the order chosen for the Cartan matrix above, i.e., the nodes are read in the five-node chain first, with the last node being connected to the middle one).

E6 polytope 
The E6 polytope is the convex hull of the roots of E6. It therefore exists in 6 dimensions; its symmetry group contains the Coxeter group for E6 as an index 2 subgroup.

Chevalley and Steinberg groups of type E6 and 2E6

The points over a finite field with q elements of the (split) algebraic group E6 (see above), whether of the adjoint (centerless) or simply connected form (its algebraic universal cover), give a finite Chevalley group.  This is closely connected to the group written E6(q), however there is ambiguity in this notation, which can stand for several things:

 the finite group consisting of the points over Fq of the simply connected form of E6 (for clarity, this can be written E6,sc(q) or more rarely  and is known as the "universal" Chevalley group of type E6 over Fq),
 (rarely) the finite group consisting of the points over Fq of the adjoint form of E6 (for clarity, this can be written E6,ad(q), and is known as the "adjoint" Chevalley group of type E6 over Fq), or
 the finite group which is the image of the natural map from the former to the latter: this is what will be denoted by E6(q) in the following, as is most common in texts dealing with finite groups.

From the finite group perspective, the relation between these three groups, which is quite analogous to that between SL(n,q), PGL(n,q) and PSL(n,q), can be summarized as follows: E6(q) is simple for any q, E6,sc(q) is its Schur cover, and E6,ad(q) lies in its automorphism group; furthermore, when q−1 is not divisible by 3, all three coincide, and otherwise (when q is congruent to 1 mod 3), the Schur multiplier of E6(q) is 3 and E6(q) is of index 3 in E6,ad(q), which explains why E6,sc(q) and E6,ad(q) are often written as 3·E6(q) and E6(q)·3. From the algebraic group perspective, it is less common for E6(q) to refer to the finite simple group, because the latter is not in a natural way the set of points of an algebraic group over Fq unlike E6,sc(q) and E6,ad(q).

Beyond this "split" (or "untwisted") form of E6, there is also one other form of E6 over the finite field Fq, known as 2E6, which is obtained by twisting by the non-trivial automorphism of the Dynkin diagram of E6. Concretely, 2E6(q), which is known as a Steinberg group, can be seen as the subgroup of E6(q2) fixed by the composition of the non-trivial diagram automorphism and the non-trivial field automorphism of Fq2.  Twisting does not change the fact that the algebraic fundamental group of 2E6,ad is Z/3Z, but it does change those q for which the covering of 2E6,ad by 2E6,sc is non-trivial on the Fq-points.  Precisely: 2E6,sc(q) is a covering of 2E6(q), and 2E6,ad(q) lies in its automorphism group; when q+1 is not divisible by 3, all three coincide, and otherwise (when q is congruent to 2 mod 3), the degree of 2E6,sc(q) over 2E6(q) is 3 and 2E6(q) is of index 3 in 2E6,ad(q), which explains why 2E6,sc(q) and 2E6,ad(q) are often written as 3·2E6(q) and 2E6(q)·3.

Two notational issues should be raised concerning the groups 2E6(q).  One is that this is sometimes written 2E6(q2), a notation which has the advantage of transposing more easily to the Suzuki and Ree groups, but the disadvantage of deviating from the notation for the Fq-points of an algebraic group.  Another is that whereas 2E6,sc(q) and 2E6,ad(q) are the Fq-points of an algebraic group, the group in question also depends on q (e.g., the points over Fq2 of the same group are the untwisted E6,sc(q2) and E6,ad(q2)).

The groups E6(q) and 2E6(q) are simple for any q, and constitute two of the infinite families in the classification of finite simple groups. Their order is given by the following formula :

. The order of E6,sc(q) or E6,ad(q) (both are equal) can be obtained by removing the dividing factor gcd(3,q−1) from the first formula , and the order of 2E6,sc(q) or 2E6,ad(q) (both are equal) can be obtained by removing the dividing factor gcd(3,q+1) from the second .

The Schur multiplier of E6(q) is always gcd(3,q−1) (i.e., E6,sc(q) is its Schur cover). The Schur multiplier of 2E6(q) is gcd(3,q+1) (i.e., 2E6,sc(q) is its Schur cover) outside of the exceptional case q=2 where it is 22·3 (i.e., there is an additional 22-fold cover).  The outer automorphism group of E6(q) is the product of the diagonal automorphism group Z/gcd(3,q−1)Z (given by the action of E6,ad(q)), the group Z/2Z of diagram automorphisms, and the group of field automorphisms (i.e., cyclic of order f if q=pf where p is prime).  The outer automorphism group of 2E6(q) is the product of the diagonal automorphism group Z/gcd(3,q+1)Z (given by the action of 2E6,ad(q)) and the group of field automorphisms (i.e., cyclic of order f if q=pf where p is prime).

Importance in physics 

 supergravity in five dimensions, which is a dimensional reduction from  dimensional supergravity, admits an  bosonic global symmetry and an  bosonic local symmetry. Physical states are in representations of the coset .

In grand unification theories,  appears as a possible gauge group which, after its breaking, gives rise to  gauge group of the standard model. Including the  charge we have

Where the subscript denotes the  charge.

Likewise, the fundamental representation  and its conjugate  break into a scalar , a vector  and a spinor, either  or :

Thus, one can get the Standard Model's elementary fermions and Higgs boson.

See also 
 En (Lie algebra)
 ADE classification
 Freudenthal magic square

References 
.

Algebraic groups
Lie groups
Exceptional Lie algebras